The Command Chief Petty Officer is the senior non-commissioned member in the Royal Canadian Navy. 

The primary role of the Command Chief is to provide the Commander of the Navy with the non-commissioned sailor's perspective, acting on behalf of all sailors in the Navy.

They are also the senior advisor to the Commander RCN on dress, discipline, professional development, administration, morale, training, welfare, conditions of service and the Quality of Life of all military personnel within the Navy.

List of RCN Command Chief Petty Officers

References

Royal Canadian Navy